Terrell Historic District is a national historic district located at Terrell, Catawba County, North Carolina. The district encompasses 11 contributing buildings in the crossroads community of Terrell. Most of the buildings date from the late-19th an early-20th century and includes notable examples of Greek Revival and Late Victorian style architecture. Notable buildings include the Connor Store and Post Office (c. 1891), Coleman-Caldwell-Gabriel House (c. 1854), Sherrill-Gabriel House (c. 1880s, 1906), Rehobeth Methodist Church (1889, 1950s), Gabriel Cotton Gin (1932), Cotton Storage Building (c. 1930), and Walter Gabriel House (c. 1902).

It was added to the National Register of Historic Places in 1986.

References

Historic districts on the National Register of Historic Places in North Carolina
Greek Revival architecture in North Carolina
Victorian architecture in North Carolina
Buildings and structures in Catawba County, North Carolina
National Register of Historic Places in Catawba County, North Carolina